The Capital City Street Railway, also known as the Lightning Route, was the first citywide system of streetcars established in Montgomery, Alabama, on April 15, 1886. This early technology was developed by the Belgian-American inventor Charles Joseph Van Depoele. Joseph Arthur Gaboury was the owner of the horse-drawn system that was converted to electricity. One trolley route ended at the Cloverdale neighborhood. This early public transportation system made Montgomery one of the first cities to "depopulate" its residential areas at the city center through transportation-facilitated suburban development. The system operated for exactly 50 years, until April 15, 1936, when it was retired in a big ceremony and replaced by buses.

Racial segregation

It was on this system that Montgomery's segregated racial seating was established in the early 1900s, which continued on the city buses after 1936. There was a Montgomery streetcar boycott from 1900 to 1902 to protest segregated service. However, the city council passed the Montgomery Streetcar Act in 1906 that further mandated a continuation of segregation. Segregation ended with the famous Montgomery bus boycott started by Rosa Parks and led by Rev. Martin Luther King Jr. and E. D. Nixon that lasted from December 2, 1955, to December 20, 1956.

City ownership
In 1974, the City of Montgomery took over ownership of the system that was then known at the Montgomery Area Transit System or MATS. Since the centennial of the Lightning Route in 1986 there have been various initiatives to re-establish a light-rail system in Montgomery. In place of light rail a system of tourist trolleys (diesel buses) known as the Lightning Route Trolleys currently operates in the city's historic districts.

See also 
 Berlin Straßenbahn - a Berlin electric streetcar system that started operation in 1881.
 Browder v. Gayle
 History of trams
 Richmond Union Passenger Railway - a Richmond, Virginia electric streetcar system that started operation in 1888.
 Union Station (Montgomery) - a preserved Lightning Route streetcar is housed in a building near the old railroad station.

References 

Defunct Alabama railroads
Streetcars in Alabama
History of Montgomery, Alabama
Transportation in Montgomery, Alabama
Capital City Street Railway